Dylan Pierias (born 20 February 2000) is an Australian professional soccer player who plays as a winger for Western United.

Pieras qualified for the Tokyo 2020 Olympics. He was part of the Olyroos Olympic squad. The team beat Argentine in their first group match but were unable to win another match. They were therefore not in medal contention.

Club career
Pierias began playing as a seven-year-old at Keilor Park SC, moving to Spring Hills as a teenager.

Melbourne City
With eight first team players unavailable through suspension or injury, Pierias debuted for Melbourne City against Brisbane Roar on 11 February 2017 at 16 years of age, making him the first person born in the 21st Century to play in the A-League.

Western United
Pierias then signed for Western United. In May 2021, he signed a two-year contract extension with Western United.

References

External links

2000 births
Living people
Association football defenders
Australian soccer players
Melbourne City FC players
Western United FC players
A-League Men players
Soccer players from Melbourne
Footballers at the 2020 Summer Olympics
Olympic soccer players of Australia